2002–03 Nemzeti Bajnokság I (men's handball) season.

Team information

Regular season

Standings

Pld - Played; W - Won; L - Lost; PF - Points for; PA - Points against; Diff - Difference; Pts - Points.

References 

Nemzeti Bajnokság I (men's handball)
2002 in Hungarian sport
Nemzet
2002–03 domestic handball leagues